The Mersey class was a class of Admiralty trawlers built for the Royal Navy (or other government institutions) prior to World War II.  Many went on to be used in various roles during World War II.  The ships constituting this class were built as standard Mersey class or as non-standard class vessels.

Characteristics
The Mersey-class trawlers were purpose-built, standard Admiralty design intended for patrol, ASW and minesweeping roles. HMT John Quilliam, delivered in June 1917, was the first of the standard completions.  The smallest of the non-standard ships measured  in length with a  beam.

Armament
  1x 76/40 Quick Fire 12-pounder naval gun:
 John Edmund, John Highland, John Jacobs, John Johnson, John Pasco, John Quilliam, John Welstead, John Yule, Richard Bulkeley, Richard Colliver, Robert Double, Robert Drummond, Samuel Jameson, Thomas Jarvis, Thomas Johns, Thomas Whipple, William Doak, William Honnor, William Inwood, William Jackson, William Johnson, William Ram
 1x 76/40 Quick Fire 12-pounder naval gun, mechanical minesweeping gear:
 Cornelius Buckley, William Abrahams, Andrew King, George Andrew, Henry Cramwell, Henry Ford, Isaac Chant, James Buchanan, Lewis Roatley, Michael Clements, Robert Barton, Robert Bookless, Thomas Atkinson, Thomas Bailey, Thomas Thresher, William Jones, William Rivers
 2x 76/40 Quick Fire 12-pounder naval gun, mechanical minesweeping gear:
 William Westenburgh
 1x 102/40 MkI/III 4" Quick fire naval gun, 1x 76/40 Quick Fire 12-pounder naval gun, 1x Depth-charge thrower:
 Fraser Eaves
 1x 76/40 Quick Fire 12-pounder naval gun, 1x Depth-charge thrower:
 George Bligh, James Adams, John Ebbs, John Felton, John Jefferson, Lewes Reeves, Nicholas Dean, Samuel Dowden, Thomas Cornwall
 1x 57/40 6-pounder Hotchkiss Mk I naval gun:
 Richard Jewell
 1x 102/40 MkI/III 4" Quick fire naval gun
 Thomas Jago:

Ships of standard Mersey class
All vessels listed based on this citation unless stated otherwise.  HMT prefix: A public vessel hired by HM Sea Transport Service for service as a Transport (thus Hired Military Transport, though often referred to as “His Majesty’s Troopship”). Also, His Majesty’s Trawler and His Majesty’s Tug, as RN auxiliary support vessels (these might also be hired from the merchant marine).

Non-standard vessels
All vessels listed based on this citation unless stated otherwise.

Cancelled vessels
A further 44 vessels were ordered, but were cancelled before delivery.

References

Ship classes of the Royal Navy
Minesweepers
Minesweepers of the Royal Navy
Research vessels of the United Kingdom
Trawlers